The Sir Matt Busby Player of the Year, previously known as the MUFC Members Player of the Year (1988–1995), is an award presented to the Manchester United fans' player of the season. It is named after former Manchester United manager Sir Matt Busby, who managed the club in two spells, from 1945 to 1969 and from 1970 to 1971. The award was renamed in his honour in 1996, following his death in 1994, and a new trophy was commissioned – a scaled-down replica of the statue of Busby at the east end of Old Trafford.

The first winner of the award was Brian McClair in 1988, who also became the first player to win it twice, having also won it in 1992. Since then, seven other players have won the award more than once, of which five have won it in consecutive seasons: Roy Keane (1999, 2000), Ruud van Nistelrooy (2002, 2003), Cristiano Ronaldo (2007, 2008), David de Gea (2014, 2015, 2016), and Bruno Fernandes (2020, 2021). Ronaldo's 2008 win made him the first player to receive the award three times, having also won in 2004. De Gea won the award in 2016 for the third consecutive year, becoming the second player after Ronaldo to do so, and the first in three consecutive seasons. De Gea won the award for a fourth time in 2018, the first player to do so, and Ronaldo joined him after winning his fourth in 2022.

Voting takes place towards the end of each season, usually in April, and is open to anyone who has an account on the club's official website. Voting was originally done by post until the 1994–95 season, when a phone voting system was introduced. Postal voting forms were included in the club magazine, Inside United, and before that, voting was open only to members of the official supporters' club, who would receive a voting form in the post at the end of the season. Until the establishment of the official supporters' club, a separate award had been given by the members of its predecessor, the independent Manchester United Supporters Club.

Other end-of-season awards given by Manchester United include the Denzil Haroun Reserve Player of the Year Award, the Jimmy Murphy Young Player of the Year Award, the Players' Player of the Year Award, and the Goal of the Season Award. Of these, the Jimmy Murphy Young Player of the Year Award and the Players' Player of the Year Award are voted for by the players. The prizes for all five awards are given at an annual awards night, which is held near the end of the league season and broadcast live on the club's television channel, MUTV. A list of winners of the youth awards can be seen here.

Winners

Players in bold are still playing for Manchester United

Wins by player

Wins by playing position

Wins by nationality

Players' Player of the Year

References

External links
Sir Matt Busby Player of the Year Award at MUFCInfo.com
All Player of the Year Winners at ManUtd.com

Manchester United F.C.
Manchester United F.C.
Association football player non-biographical articles